Kamran Mirza (July 22, 1856 – April 15, 1929), was a Persian Prince of Qajar dynasty and third surviving son of Nasser al-Din Shah. He was the brother of Mass'oud Mirza Zell-e Soltan and Mozzafar al-Din Shah. He was also the progenitor of the Kamrani Family. He might have been Prime minister of Iran for a few days in April–May 1909, but this is not clearly referenced. Kamran Mirza also served as Iran's Commander-in-Chief, appointed in 1868 for the first time, and minister of war from 1880 to 1896 and from 1906 to 1907.

Biography
Kamran Mirza Nayeb es-Saltaneh, born 22 July 1856 in Tehran, was the son of Nasser al-Din Shah and the brother of Mass'oud Mirza Zell-e Soltan and Mozzafar al-Din Mirza. His mother, Monir al-Saltaneh, was the daughter of the architect to the crown. Due to Nasser-ed-Din Shah's dislike of Mozaffar-ed-Din Mirza, he was the Shah's favored son for succession, but on account of the non-Qajar origin of his mother, like his other brother Mass'oud Mirza Zell-e Soltan, Kamran Mirza was not eligible for succession to the throne.

He was educated by private tutors and at the Imperial Military College in Tehran. In 1862, when he was 6, Nasser al-Din Shah appointed him as the governor of Tehran with the stewardship of Pasha Khan Amin ol-Molk. He was styled Na'eb es-Saltaneh, Vice Regent, in 1867 before the Shah's trip to Khorasan and was given the title Amir Kabir, grand commander, the highest rank in the Qajar military, by his father in 1869. He was governor of Tehran 1862–1863 and 1875–1876, governor of Qazvin and Gilan 1878–1884, Mazandaran 1878–1884, and Minister for War from 1869 to 1873, 1884, 1896.

The star of Kamran Mirza's fortunes plummeted, but it was not entirely eclipsed, after the assassination of Nasser al-Din Shah in 1896. His daughter, Malekeh Jahan, married to Mohammad Ali Mirza who was later crowned as Mohammad Ali Shah. During the Constitutional Revolution he established the pro-court society. He was minister of war in 1908. In the reign of his grandson, Ahmad Shah, he was Governor-General of Khorasan from 1916 to 1917.

Kamran Mirza Nayeb es-Saltaneh died in Tehran on April 15, 1929, and was buried in Qom. The Kamranieh district in the North Tehran belonged to him. He received the Order of the Royal Portrait, Temsaal-e Homayouni, from his father.

Honours

 Order of the Royal Portrait (Temsal-e-Homayouni) of Persia
 1st Class of the Order of Neshan-e Aqdas of Persia
 1st Class of the Order of the Lion and the Sun of Persia
 Knight of the Order of St. Andrew of Russia
 Knight of the Order of St. Alexander Nevsky of Russia
 Knight of the Order of St. Stanislas of Russia
 Knight of the Order of the White Eagle of Russia
 1st class of the Order of St. Anne of Russia
 Grand cross of the Order of Leopold of Austria -1880

Children

Nayeb es-Saltaneh was married to eleven wives. His first wife, Sorour ed-Dowleh was daughter of Morad Mirza Hessam es-Saltaneh Conqueror of Herat son of Abbas Mirza. They had four children, Princess Malakeh Jahan, wife of Mohammad Ali Shah and mother of Soltan Ahmad Shah; Ma’ssoumeh Khanom died in her youth, Qamar-ol-Moluk died when she was 14 and Fath Ali Mirza died aged five. Kamran Mirza also had 22 children from his other wives, 10 daughters and 12 sons.

sons
 Prince Fat'h Ali Mirza
 Prince Mohammad Mehdi Mirza Zell-os-Saltaneh
 Prince Abbas Mirza E'ezaz-es-Saltaneh
 Prince Abdollah Mirza E'etezad Khaqan
 Prince Hassan Ali Mirza Farrokh-od-Dowleh
 Prince Soltan Salim Mirza Salar-e Aghdas
 Prince Ebrahim Mirza Salar-e A'azam
 Prince Mohmmad Reza Mirza Firouz-od-Dowleh
 Prince Mohammad Baqer Mirza Amir Arf'a
 Prince Hossein Ali Mirza Eghtedar-os-Saltaneh
 Prince Mohammad Taqi Mirza Nosrat-ol-Soltan
 Prince Mahmud Mirza Amir Akram

daughters
 Princess Malakeh Jahan, mother of Soltan Ahmad Shah
 Princess Safieh Monir A'azam
 Princess Mahtaban Mo'azaz A'azam
 Princess Ensieh Houra
 Princess Farrokh A'azam
 Princess Banoo Olia
 Princess Nayyer A'azam
 Princess Fakhr-e Olia
 Princess Negar-ol-Molouk
 Princess Banoo Aghdas

References

 Moayer-ol-Mamalek, Dustali (1982). Rejale Asre Nassery.

Qajar princes
1856 births
1929 deaths
Field marshals of Iran
People of the Persian Constitutional Revolution

Recipients of the Order of Saint Stanislaus (Russian)
Recipients of the Order of the White Eagle (Russia)
19th-century Iranian politicians
Defence ministers of Iran
20th-century Iranian politicians